Hyderabad Municipal Corporation (HMC) is a public corporation and governing body to provide municipal services in Hyderabad and Latifabad Talukas of Hyderabad, the 2nd largest city of Sindh, Pakistan.

Hyderabad Municipal Corporation has 96 general seats and 47 reserved seats. it was made defunct in Sindh Local Ordinance 2001, but was revived by PPP government. Qasimabad was taken out of HMC and formed separate municipal committee.

The 96 elected chairmen of Union Committee become members of Hyderabad Municipal Corporation and elect their mayor and deputy mayor

HMC comprises 96 Union Councils of Hyderabad City and Latifabad Talukas.

On August 30, 2016, MQM's Mayor and deputy mayor took office in Hyderabad Municipal Corporation.

Hyderabad Local Elections

Election 1987

Election 2005

Election 2015 

On August 24, 2016, through Mayor elections, Tayyab Hussain and Suhail Mashadi of MQM were elected Mayor and Deputy Mayor of Hyderabad respectively. They bagged 111 votes, while their rival PPP candidates got 27 votes. They took oath on August 30, 2016.

See also 
 Mayor of Hyderabad

References 

Mayors of Hyderabad, Sindh
Hyderabad, Sindh-related lists
Municipal corporations in Pakistan